Filippo Ghirelli (born 23 January 1980) is an Italian businessman and philanthropist based in the Principality of Monaco. Filippo is the founder and Executive Chairman of Genera Group which operates in fields of energy and process efficiency, energy production, green infrastructures and EV charging stations. Genera is one of the European top circular economy investment firms with branches in Europe, Brazil, China and the U.S.. 
Filippo also promotes international operations in the field of industrial conversion and  capture, oil & gas, real estate development, general construction contract, mining and diversified investments. Filippo is chairman and majority shareholder of green energy trader OV Energy S.p.A; he is also founder of Mareterra Group Holding which operates in the field if oil & gas by converting such assets into sustainable.

Biography
Filippo was born in an Italian family of real estate entrepreneurs in Rome, attended international schools and graduated from the University of Rome in Civil Engineering with further specialization courses at MIT and Harvard. Also, he obtained a Master in Business Administration and a Master in Financial Markets.

After BA degree he started his career as Project Engineer in Guinea, Ghana and Mali working with various construction multinationals. Later on he returned to Italy to follow high speed train infrastructures. In 2007 he became General Manager for real estate and healthcare operator De Angelis Group. After sudden death of its founder, Filippo started his own construction business with Italian and international projects in 2009. Also, he has been the director and shareholder of Leaf Investments, an investment boutique based in London. Later he opened a retail real estate development company and started to invest in energy assets. Ghirelli's group presently operates in various countries, such as Italy, Spain, France, Brazil, China, Morocco, Algeria, India and the UAE and has JV's with major multinationals and financial institutions.

Filippo is actively involved in international business community life, visited events such as “The companies and banks in the state of crisis of competence, responsibility and prevention”.

Filippo is also an active member of Prince Albert II of Monaco Foundation and Monaco Ambassadors Club and, in 2019, he joined the executive board of the Young Presidents Organization, with more than 28,000 members worldwide. Filippo and his wife Daniela recently founded The Venetian Arts Foundation, with the purpose of promoting venetian arts around the world.

Assets
Filippo owns Genera Group Holdings which also invests in R&D and acts as incubator for start-ups. Through his company, Ghirelli holds stakes in many other ventures. He pursues the idea of  "exponential sustainability" with a focus on all those infrastructural projects that allow future generations to be able to make choices rather than inheriting what others have elaborated in the past with a less effective technology base. 
His group has recently seen the entrance of Swiss fund SUSI PARTNERS with performed investments exceeding 1.5 B€. 
Filippo was also involved in football team Mallorca acquisition in late 2014.

References

1980 births
Living people
Italian businesspeople
Italian philanthropists